Abdul Majeed Abdullah (Arabic: عبدالمجيد عبدالله; born 3 August 1962) is a Saudi singer, composer, and actor. One of the most well-known performers of popular music in Middle East, he started his musical career after being discovered by his mentor Ibrahim Sultan, who accompanied a young Abdul Majeed to Jeddah where he started singing on a local radio station.

Since then he has released many albums and singles to this day. He regularly performs at many local and international music festivals. In 2019, he was honored with a star on Dubai Walk of Fame. In 2020, he, along with 12 other Saudi artistes, was featured in a national song titled "Salam from Saudi Arabia", which was a major collaborative effort with Rotana Audio Visual, Saudi Arabia's General Entertainment Authority (GEA).

Personal life

Abdul Majeed Abdullah has three children namely Abdullah, Muhammed, & Manar. In 2020, his son Mohamed Abdul Majeed Abdullah launched his musical career with the release of his first single "Ya Bakhty Fek".

In March 2020, he closed his official Twitter account after some users circulated his responses to some offensive tweets by unknown accounts.

Discography

Albums 

 Rayeg (2000)
 Yataib el Galb (2000)
 The Best of Jalsahs (2000)
 Inta al Aziz (2000)
 Best Of (2001)
 Raheeb (2001)
 Rouhi Tehibbak (2001)
 Ostaz Ishq (2001)
 Abdul Majeed Abdullah (2004)
 Layalina (2004)
 Ghali (2004)
 El Hob el Jedeed (2005
 Ensan Aktar (2006)
 A'azz el Naz (2006)
 Al Hob al Jadid (2006)
 Haflet Jedda 2007 (2007)
 Melyon Khater (2008)
 Aalam Mowazi (2021)

Singles & EPs 
 "Live 2004" (2004)
 "Tanakud" 
 "Hala Bish"

Charted songs

References

External links
 Official YouTube Channel

1962 births
Living people
20th-century Saudi Arabian male singers
21st-century Saudi Arabian male singers
Saudi Arabian male film actors
Saudi Arabian male television actors